Sturla Brandth Grøvlen (born 11 March 1980) is a Norwegian cinematographer, who lives and works in Denmark. For his work on Victoria (2015), Grøvlen won a Silver Bear for Outstanding Artistic Contribution for Cinematography at the 65th Berlin International Film Festival.

Early life and education 
Grøvlen grew up in the Kattem and Lundåsen neighbourhoods of Trondheim, Norway. He studied film history and film theory at Lillehammer University College from 2000 to 2001. He then studied at European Film College in Ebeltoft from 2001 to 2002. He studied photography at Bergen Academy of Art and Design from 2003 to 2006, receiving a Bachelor of Fine Arts degree. Between 2007 and 2011, he studied film at the National Film School of Denmark in Copenhagen.

Career 
Until 2013, Grøvlen spelled his middle name Brandt.

Grøvlen was cinematographer on Anders Morgenthaler's drama The 11th Hour (2014), starring Kim Basinger and Sebastian Schipper. Grøvlen then completed the cinematography on Schipper's film Victoria (2015). The film was screened in the main competition section of the 65th Berlin International Film Festival where Grøvlen won a Silver Bear for Outstanding Artistic Contribution for Cinematography. The film has a 140-minute runtime and was shot in a single continuous take, without cuts. Victoria was Grøvlen's second feature film as a cinematographer. He was also a cinematographer on the Icelandic film Hrútar, which premiered in 2015 and won the audience award at the Tromsø International Film Festival in 2016. He was also the cinematographer on the Danish film Another Round (2020), directed by Thomas Vinterberg. Another Round was awarded the Academy Award for Best International Feature Film and the BAFTA Award for Best Film Not in the English Language.

In January 2021, he was awarded the Liv Ullmann Prize for his efforts as a leading cinematographer in both Nordic and international film.

Personal life 
Grøvlen lives and works in Copenhagen. In addition to his mother tongue of Norwegian, he is fluent in Danish and English.

Filmography

Film

Short films

Television series

Music videos

Awards and honours 
 2015: Silver Bear for Outstanding Artistic Contribution for Cinematography for Victoria by Sebastian Schipper (tied with Evgeniy Privin and Serhiy Mykhalchuk for Under Electric Clouds)
 2015: Best Cinematography for Victoria in the 65th ceremony of the German Film Awards.

References

External links 
 
 
 
 
 
 
 

1980 births
Living people
Norwegian cinematographers
Norwegian male artists
People from Trondheim
Lillehammer University College alumni
Bergen Academy of Art and Design alumni
German Film Award winners
Norwegian emigrants to Denmark